Celtic, Celtics or Keltic may refer to:

Language and ethnicity
pertaining to Celts, a collection of Indo-European peoples in Europe and Anatolia
Celts (modern)
Celtic languages
Proto-Celtic language
Celtic music
Celtic nations

Sports

Football clubs
Celtic F.C., a Scottish professional football club based in Glasgow
Celtic F.C. Women
Bangor Celtic F.C., Northern Irish, defunct
Belfast Celtic F.C., Northern Irish, defunct
Blantyre Celtic F.C., Scottish, defunct
Bloemfontein Celtic F.C., South African
Castlebar Celtic F.C., Irish
Celtic F.C. (Jersey City), United States, defunct
Celtic FC America, from Houston, Texas
Celtic Nation F.C., English, defunct
Cleator Moor Celtic F.C., English
Cork Celtic F.C., Irish, defunct
Cwmbran Celtic F.C., Welsh
Derry Celtic F.C., Irish, defunct
Donegal Celtic F.C., Northern Irish
Dungiven Celtic F.C., Northern Irish, defunct
Farsley Celtic F.C., English
Leicester Celtic A.F.C., Irish
Lurgan Celtic F.C., Northern Irish
Stalybridge Celtic F.C., English
Tuam Celtic A.F.C., Irish
Walker Celtic F.C., English, defunct
Wayside Celtic F.C., Irish
West Allotment Celtic F.C., English

Other uses in sports
Celtic Camogie Club, Dublin, Ireland
Celtic de Paris, a French rugby league team
Boston Celtics, an American professional basketball team
Dewsbury Celtic, an English rugby League club
Oban Celtic, a Scottish shinty club

Other uses
Celtic (ship), the name of several ships
"Celtic", U.S. Secret Service code name for Joe Biden

See also

Celt (disambiguation)
Celtic culture (disambiguation)
Celticism (disambiguation)
Celtici, a Celtic tribe or group of tribes of the Iberian peninsula
Names of the Celts

Language and nationality disambiguation pages